Alan Gane (born 11 June 1950) is an English former amateur footballer and manager. He is notable for promoting Wycombe Wanderers from the non-League Isthmian League into the Conference National in 1986.

Playing career
Gane played football between 1964 and 1986. His only Football League appearances were for Hereford United during the 1973–74 season.

Managerial career
Gane turned to football management, between 1986 and 1996.

Wycombe Wanderers
Gane was manager of Wycombe Wanderers for one season and helped relegated Wycombe achieve its best ever performance in the Isthmian League. They finished top having won 32 games out of 42 and were promoted to the Conference National again. He resigned shortly before the start of the next season partly due to a changing situation at work and partly due to a dispute with the chairman over some proposed signings.

References

External links

1950 births
Living people
Footballers from Chiswick
English footballers
English football managers
Sutton United F.C. players
Slough Town F.C. players
Brentford F.C. players
Wycombe Wanderers F.C. players
Hereford United F.C. players
Chelmsford City F.C. players
Staines Town F.C. players
Walton & Hersham F.C. players
Wycombe Wanderers F.C. managers
Sutton United F.C. managers
English Football League players
Wokingham & Emmbrook F.C. players
Wokingham Town F.C. players
Association football midfielders